Edward Packer (9 July 1855 – 3 December 1932) was a Barbadian cricketer. He played in three first-class matches for the Barbados cricket team from 1883 to 1888.

See also
 List of Barbadian representative cricketers

References

External links
 

1855 births
1932 deaths
Barbadian cricketers
Barbados cricketers
People from Saint Michael, Barbados